MS Sevenhill is a ro-ro freight ferry built in 1978. She was probably best known for its time at Seatruck Ferries, named Moondance. The vessel was originally built for Emadala Shipping.

Career

Gilnavi (1978-90)
Launched in 1978 as the Emadala, she was chartered to Gilnavi and used on the Genoa-Malta-Piraeus-Alexandria route. Sevenhill was sold to Gilnavi in 1990.

Cencargo (1990-97)
In 1990, Sevenhill was sold to Cencargo in 1993, during her time with Cencargo she was named Merchant Victor. She was used on the Heysham-Warrenpoint and Ostend-Ramsgate routes until 1993, when she was chartered for use in the Caribbean. In 1994 she returned to British waters, being used on the Hull-Zeebrugge and Felixstowe-Zeebrugge routes. In 1996 she was used on the Belfast-Heysham route, and in 1997 she was used on the Portsmouth-Guernsey - Jersey route, then the Dartford - Zeebrugge route.

Seatruck (1997-2010)
In 1997 she was chartered by Seatruck, and renamed Moondance. She was purchased by Seatruck in 1998 for use on the Heysham-Warrenpoint route. In April 2008 she was awaiting a refit in Birkenhead.

On 29 June 2008 she was involved in a grounding incident at Warrenpoint after an electrical failure put the controllable pitch propellers into full astern, which was a default setting. Moondance suffered damage to her rudders and rudder stocks. An underlying cause of the accident was insufficient manning of the bridge and engine room and lax operating procedures on board Moondance.
Moondance returned to service on 16 October 2008 running between Heysham and Warrenpoint. This route began operation on 2 February 2009.

With the suspension of Fredericia-Moss service from 10 February 2009, Moondance briefly laid up in Denmark before returning to Liverpool where she was laid up in East Huskisson dock.

Starline Maritime (2010-)
In 2010 Sevenhill was purchased by Starline Maritime in Cyprus and renamed Kibris Gunesi, before being renamed in August 2012 to Sevenhill. The vessel is currently operated by Sevenhill Maritime out of the port of Samsun, Turkey.

See also
 MS Riverdance - Moondance's sister ship that sank off the coast of Blackpool, England.

References

Ships of Seatruck Ferries
Ferries of the United Kingdom
Merchant ships of the Bahamas
1978 ships
Ships built in Bremen (state)